Seth Chase Taft (December 31, 1922 – April 14, 2013) was an American politician of the Republican party and a grandson of President William Howard Taft.

Early life and education
Seth Chase Taft's paternal grandfather was President William Howard Taft. His parents were Cincinnati, Ohio mayor Charles Phelps Taft II and Eleanor Chase Taft, whose father ran the Waterbury Clock Company. Taft had five sisters and one brother and grew up in Cincinnati, Ohio. He married Frances "Franny" Prindle from New Haven, Connecticut.

Career
Taft was an unsuccessful candidate for the Ohio Senate in 1962. He ran for the office of the mayor of Cleveland, in 1967, losing to Democratic candidate Carl B. Stokes, the first African American mayor of a major city.

In 1982, Taft sought the Republican nomination for governor of Ohio, but he lost the primary race to Clarence J. "Bud" Brown Jr. He was, however, a Cuyahoga County, Ohio Commissioner. Seth and Franny Taft had three sons: Frederick I. Taft, Thomas P. Taft, and Seth T. Taft, and a daughter, Cynthia Taft.

Seth Taft served as Cuyahoga County Commissioner from 1971 to 1978. He died on April 14, 2013, at his home in Pepper Pike, Ohio, after a fall at 90 years old. His wife Franny died four years later, at 95.  They are survived by 4 children, 10 grandchildren, and 12 great grandchildren.

See also
Taft family
Self-published autobiographical essay: Take on the World! And See How Much You Learn! Seth Taft, December 1998

Notes

1922 births
2013 deaths
Taft family
Politicians from Cincinnati
County commissioners in Ohio
Ohio Republicans